"Dies sind die heilgen zehn Gebot" (These are the holy Ten Commandments) is a hymn by the Protestant reformer Martin Luther based on the Ten Commandments. It appeared first in 1524 in the Erfurt Enchiridion.

History 
The reformer Martin Luther wrote the hymn in twelve stanzas of four lines each as a catechetical setting of the Ten Commandments. The commandments were used for confession and for instructions. After an introduction, stanzas 2 to 10 are related to the ten commandments; 11 and 12 provide a conclusion, related to Jesus. In 1524, Luther published the hymn in the Erfurt Enchiridion with a hymn tune, Zahn No. 1951, based on an older melody ("In Gottes Namen Fahren wir"). The hymn is a "Leise", concluding each stanza by "Kyrieleis".

The hymn also appeared in Johann Walter's choral hymnal  in 1524. It appeared in 1854 in Schircks's edition of Luther‘s hymns (Geistliche Lieder), and in the hymnal Unverfälschter Liedersegen in 1851. In the current Protestant German hymnal, the Evangelisches Gesangbuch, it is EG 231.

The only common translation is titled "That men a godly life might live". It was published in Richard Massie's M. Luther's Spiritual Songs in 1854, and in the Ohio Lutheran Hymnal in 1880.

Melody and settings 
The melody was assigned as for "In Gottes Namen fahren wir", but other melodies were also used, such as "Wär Gott nicht mit uns diese Zeit".

Johann Michael Bach composed a chorale prelude, Jan Pieterszoon Sweelinck wrote two variations for organ, and Johann Hermann Schein composed a setting for two soprano voices and continuo. Johann Sebastian Bach wrote a four-part setting, BWV 298; he used the chorale in the opening movement of cantata Du sollt Gott, deinen Herren, lieben, BWV 77.  The chorale juxtaposes the topic of the cantata, the commandment of love. In his Clavier-Übung III, he dedicated two pieces to the chorale, a chorale prelude with five voices and a fughetta for single manual, BWV 678-679. Bach also wrote the first of the catechism chorale preludes, BWV 635, for the Orgelbüchlein.

References

Sources 
Books
 
 
 
 

 

Online sources

External links 
 
 
 
 That Man a Godly Life Might Live hymntime.org
 Dies sind die heilgen zehn Gebot BWV 298; BC F 46.1 Bach Digital
 Dies sind die heiligen zehen Gebot ("Klavierübung, Teil 3") BWV 678 Bach Digital
  Fughetta super: Dies sind die heiligen zehen Gebot ("Klavierübung, Teil 3") BWV 679  Bach Digital

16th-century hymns in German
Hymn tunes
Hymns by Martin Luther